"Crazy" is a song recorded by Belgian DJ Lost Frequencies and Dutch duo Zonderling. It was released on 24 November 2017 through Armada Music. This song is a remix of "Call Me Crazy" by David Benjamin, who also provides vocals for this song.

Background 
Lost Frequencies released the single to celebrate his one billion streams all over the world, and the opening of his own label, Found Frequencies.  He also explained the genesis of the song:

Charts

Weekly charts

Year-end charts

Certifications

References 

Lost Frequencies songs
2017 singles
Armada Music singles
2017 songs
Number-one singles in Belgium
Number-one singles in Poland
Songs written by Allan Eshuijs
Songs written by Lost Frequencies